Hermes Aviation, styled as flyhermes.com and known as Fly Hermes was a start-up Maltese airline, based at the Skypark Business Center, Malta International Airport in Luqa. Hermes Aviation provided scheduled and charter flights for passengers, cargo and mail.

The first scheduled services began on 15 December 2014, with routes from Turin to Malta via Comiso and Palermo. The service was halted in January 2015, following the revocation of the airline's AOC as a result of numerous delays and flight cancellations.

History 
Hermes Aviation was founded in 2014, with its first aircraft delivered on 31 May 2014 from the Italian carrier Blue Panorama Airlines.
During the summer 2014 peak season the aircraft was leased to Italian airline Mistral Air and based at Il Caravaggio International Airport in Bergamo, Italy, to operate charter service to leisure destinations in Greece and Spain.

Destinations

Fleet 

As of November 2014, the Hermes Aviation fleet consists of just one aircraft with an age of 24.6 years.

References

External links 

 

Defunct airlines of Malta
Airlines established in 2014
Airlines disestablished in 2015
2014 establishments in Malta
2015 disestablishments in Malta